Harry Mestayer (1876–1958) was an actor in silent films and theatrical productions in the U.S. He had leading roles and was a supporting actor in more than two dozen films and numerous theaterical productions. He performed in California, was in several hits in Chicago and performed on Broadway.

He was the son of Shakespearean actor Charles Mestayer and had several actors in his family.

He eventually married Victory Bateman.

The Museum of the City of New York has several photographs of him in acting roles.

Filmography
The House of a Thousand Candles (1915 film) as Jack Glenam
Stop Thief! (1915 film) as Jack Dougan
Millionaire Baby (1915)
Badgered (1916 film) (1916)
Wives of the Rich (1916)
Her Dream of Life (1916)
Wife or Country (1918), co-wrote and starred in as Dale Barker
The Atom (1918 film) as Montague Booth
Unguarded Women (1924) as Sing Woo
Flapper Wives (1924), as Charles Bigelow 
Black Oxen (1923) as James Oglethorpe
The Acquittal (1923) as District Attorney
The Locked Door (1929) as District Attorney

Plays
The Wild Duck (1918) on Broadway as Gregers Werle

References

1876 births
1958 deaths
American male silent film actors
20th-century American male actors
American male stage actors